The Udurchukan Formation is a geological formation located in Amur Region, Far East Russia. Based on palynomorphs such as Wodehouseia spinata the Udurchukan is considered of Maastrichtian age of the Late Cretaceous, during the Cretaceous Period.

Fossil record 
Inasmuch as Wodehouseia spinata and Aquillapollenites subtilis are known in the Americas only from the Late Maastrichtian, the presence of these palynomorphs in the Udurchukan caused Godefroit to consider the unit and its lambeosaur dominated fauna to be coeval with the Lance Formation and Hell Creek Formation. However, research in the Songliao Basin indicates Wodehouseia spinata is also known from the early (albeit not basal) and middle Maastrichtian of Asia. 

The latest view, appearing in the paper on comparative osteology of Edmontosaurus and Shantungosaurus, is that one Udurchukan Formation locality, Kundur, is late−early Maastrichtian; and the other, Blagoveschensk, is early−late Maastrichtian. The Udurchukan Formation now appears somewhat older than the Lance and Hell Creek, albeit not by much.

Dinosaurs

Other fossils 

Vertebrates
 Amuremys planicostata
 Albertosaurinae indet.
 Tyrannosaurinae indet.
 Richardoestesia sp. (morph 1)
 Richardoestesia sp. (morph 2)
 Shamosuchus sp.	
 Troodon sp.
 Dromaeosaurinae indet.
 Dromaeosauridae indet.
 cf. Saurornitholestes sp.
 Cimolodonta indet.
 Crocodylia indet.
 Hadrosaurinae indet.
 Lindholmemydidae indet.
 Nodosauridae indet.
 Testudines indet.
 Titanosauria indet.
 Theropoda indet.
 Trionychidae indet.

Insects
 Mesosigara kryshtofovichi

Flora
 Cupressinoxylon sp.

See also

References

Bibliography 
 Y. A. Popov. 1971. Historical development of the infraorder Nepomorpha (Heteroptera). Akademiya Nauk SSSR, Trudy Paleontologicheskogo Instituta 129:1-228

Geologic formations of Russia
Upper Cretaceous Series of Asia
Maastrichtian Stage
Conglomerate formations
Mudstone formations
Sandstone formations
Fluvial deposits
Paleontology in Russia
Geology of the Russian Far East
Geography of Amur Oblast
Cretaceous Russia